The 2010–11 SK Rapid Wien season is the 113th season in club history.

Squad statistics

Goal scorers

Fixtures and results

Bundesliga

League table

Cup

Europa League

Qualification

Group stage

References

Rapid Wien
2010-11 Rapid Wien Season